Eric or Erik Olson or Olsen may refer to:

Eric N. Olson (born 1955), biochemist and molecular biologist
Eric T. Olson (born 1952), retired admiral in the United States Navy and former commander of United States Special Operations Command
Eric T. Olson (philosopher), philosopher and lecturer specializing in metaphysics and philosophy of mind
Eric Christian Olsen (born 1977), American actor
Eric Olsen (writer) (born 1958), author, writer and founder of Blogcritics
Eric Olsen (American football) (born 1988), National Football League player
Eric Olsen (sailor) (1916-1993), American Olympic sailor
Erik Olson (1901–1986), Swedish painter, surrealist
Erik Olson (American football) (born 1977), American football defensive back
Eric Olsen (businessman), French-American businessman